Black Heddon is a village and former civil parish, now in the parish of Belsay, in the county of Northumberland, England. It is situated to the north-west of Newcastle upon Tyne, between Stamfordham and Belsay. In 1951 the parish had a population of 45.

According to local legend, the village was once haunted by a ghost named Silky, who used to jump onto travellers' horses. In nearby Belsay is a tree overlooking a waterfall which is known as Silky's Chair.

Governance 
Black Heddon is in the parliamentary constituency of Berwick-upon-Tweed. Black Heddon was formerly a township in Stamfordham parish, from 1866 Black Heddon was a civil parish in its own right until it was abolished on 1 April 1955 and merged with Belsey.

References

External links

Villages in Northumberland
Former civil parishes in Northumberland
Belsay